The following is a list of actors who have played animated characters.  There have been several live action films based on animated series.  This list indicates which actors represented the animated characters in the live performance.  This is not a list of voice actors playing animated characters.

The list is sorted by the original animated series, with major characters from the series listed in order of importance.  Live action actors are listed in chronological order.

Alvin and the Chipmunks characters

Avatar: The Last Airbender characters

Ben 10 characters

The Fairly OddParents characters

Fat Albert and the Cosby Kids characters

The Flintstones characters

George of the Jungle characters

Inspector Gadget characters

Masters of the Universe characters

Mr. Magoo characters

Popeye characters

The Rocky and Bullwinkle Show characters

Scooby-Doo characters

The Smurfs characters

Underdog characters

Winx Club characters

Yogi Bear characters

See also 
List of voice actors
List of live-action films based on cartoons and comics

Animated
Animated characters
Animation-related lists